County Offices, formerly Stafford Place, is a municipal structure in the High Street, Wick, Caithness, Scotland. The façade of the building, which was the headquarters of Caithness County Council and is currently used as a customer service point by The Highland Council, is a Category B listed building.

History
In the 17th and 18th centuries, the county town of Caithness and the venue for sheriff court hearings was Thurso. However, in the early 19th century, Wick developed significantly and, following a decree of the Court of Session, hearings were transferred from Thurso to Wick in 1828. The development of Wick saw new buildings in the High Street and, in particular, a curved three-storey tenement building to be known as "Stafford Place" was commissioned on the south side of the High Street, adjacent to the market place. The new building was designed in the Neo-Georgian style, built in contrasting whinstone and sandstone and was completed in 1820.

The design involved a curved main frontage of six bays facing onto the High Street. There were originally nine openings on the ground floor with doorways in the second, third, fifth and eighth openings. The building was fenestrated with sash windows on the first and second floors and there was a cill course separating each of the floors. Above, there was a shallow pyramid-shaped roof with three chimney stacks.

One of the tenements was initially occupied by a watchmaker, John Sellar, who employed the inventor, Alexander Bain, as an apprentice there between 1829 and 1830. A plaque to celebrate this event was later installed on the front of the building. In the late 1830s and early 1840s, the left-hand section of the ground floor accommodated a grocers and drapers business, Purves & Brown. However, in the mid-19th century, the left hand section of the ground floor was taken over by the bookseller and stationer, William Rae & Son, who also became the proprietor of a newspaper known as the Northern Ensign, first published in 1850.

Following the implementation of the Local Government (Scotland) Act 1889, which established county councils in every county, the new county leaders needed to identify a meeting place for Caithness County Council and duly arranged to take possession of the sheriff court and town hall complex in Bridge Street. However, in the 1930s, the county council sought dedicated county offices and acquired Stafford Place for that purpose.

After the abolition of Caithness County Council in 1975, ownership of the main building passed to Highland Regional Council and, following the introduction of unitary authorities in 1995, ownership passed to The Highland Council. In 2014, the site was re-developed to create a customer service point for the delivery of local services by the council. The works involved the complete demolition of the adjacent building to the east, which had been built in 1860s and was also owned by the council; it also involved the demolition of the structure behind the façade of Stafford Place. The works were carried out by Morgan Sindall at a cost of £8.5 million.

Notes

See also
 List of listed buildings in Wick, Highland

References

External links

Government buildings completed in 1820
County halls in Scotland
Category C listed buildings in Highland (council area)
Wick, Caithness